Kantalai is a  Divisional Secretariat  of Trincomalee District, in the Eastern Province of Sri Lanka.  To the north it is bounded by Kinniya and Thambalagamuwa divisional secretariats, and to the east by Seruvila divisional secretariat.  In the south it shares a boundary with Polonnaruwa District, while in the west it is bounded by Anuradhapura District, both of which are in the North Central Province.

In 2007 the division had a population of 42,861, of which 78.5 per cent were Sinhalese, 17.7 per cent Moors and 3.7 per cent Tamils.  The population included 302 displaced persons, 95.0 per cent of whom had been forced to move by ethnic conflict, and 5.0 per cent by the 2004 Indian Ocean tsunami.  The division is subdivided into 23 grama niladhari divisions.

References

External links
 Divisional Secretariats Portal

Divisional Secretariats of Trincomalee District